National Highway 167BG, commonly referred to as NH 167BG is a national highway in India. It is a secondary route of National Highway 67.  NH-167BG runs in the state of Andhra Pradesh in India.

Route 
NH167BG starts with it Junction with NH167B at Seetharamapuram, Udayagiri, Duttalur and terminating at its junction with NH16 at Kavali in the state of Andhra Pradesh.

Junctions  
 
  Terminal near Seetharamapuram.
  near Duttalur
  Terminal near Kavali.

See also 
 List of National Highways in India
 List of National Highways in India by state

References

External links 

 NH 167BG on OpenStreetMap

National highways in India
National Highways in Andhra Pradesh